Dungeyella is an extinct genus of chironomid midge from the Wealden amber of the Wessex Formation of the Isle of Wight, UK, containing the single species D. gavini. it belongs to the subfamily Buchonomyiinae.

References 

Chironomidae